The Finnish Open (until 2013 known as Finnish International), is an international open badminton tournament held in Finland since 1990. It was halted in 1994, 1995, and between 1997 and 2001. In 2013, it was held for the fourth time in the Energia Areena in Vantaa. In 2014, the second international tournament in Finland launched as Finnish International, then this tournament changed its title to Finnish Open. From 2023 onwards, this will be a BWF World Tour Super 500 tournament, titled Arctic Open.

Previous winners

Performances by nation

References

Badminton tournaments in Finland
Sports competitions in Finland
Recurring sporting events established in 1990